Bueninvento ("Goodinvention") is an album released by Mexican singer-songwriter and instrumentalist Julieta Venegas in 2000 to critical acclaim. "Sería Feliz" (translated as "I'd be happy") was the single released for this album, accompanied by a video that received rotation on music TV channels. The album was nominated for Latin Grammy Award for Best Rock Solo Vocal Album. In addition, Bueninvento was named the 4th best album of the 2000s decade by Latin music website Club Fonograma.  In 2012, Rolling Stone ranked Bueninvento third in its list of "The 10 Greatest Latin Rock Albums of All Time."

Track listing
This album comprises 14 songs, all written by Venegas with the exception of the song "Siempre en Mi Mente" written by Juan Gabriel.

^ Associate producer

Singles

Sería Feliz
Hoy No Quiero
Siempre en Mi Mente

Personnel 
 Julieta Venegas -  Vocals, keyboards, accordion, piano, acoustic guitar, electric guitar, programming, wurlitzer, composer
 Quique Rangel - Producer, guitar, double bass
 Emmanuel Del Real - Producer, twelve-string guitar
 Gustavo Santaolalla -  Producer, guitar, ronroco, tuba
 Rick Boston, Fernando Saunders, Ernesto Martinez - Bass guitar
 Joe Gore - acoustic guitar, electric guitar, mandolin
 Álvaro Henríquez, Juan Manuel Ledezna - Guitar
 Luis Alberto Ledezna, Curt Bisquera - Drums
 Michito Sánchez, Luis Conte - Percussion
 Javier Casalla - Violin
 Frankie Blue, Toy Hernandéz, Patrick Shavellin - Programming
 Joey Waronker - Drums, percussion
 Mitch Mannon - Trumpet
 Kim Bullard - Hammond organ B3
 Claudio Tarris, Novi Novog - Viola
 Steven Berlin - Midin mix, tenor saxophone, Flute

Production
 Producers: Gustavo Santaolalla, Emmanuel Del Real
 Co-producer: Anibal Kerpel
 Engineers: Joe Chiccarelli, Daniel Méndez, Partick Shavelin, Anibal Kerpel, Emmanuel Del Real, Quique Rangel, Luis Roman, Antonio Hernandéz, Carlos Arredondo, Ricardo Haas
 Mixing: Joe Chiccarelli
 Assistant mixing: Patrick Shevelin, Travils Smith, Jordan Scher, eric Geverlik, Edgar Hernandéz "Chicaras", Carlos Arredondo
 Pro tools production: Daniel Méndez
 Mastering: Tom Baker
 Art direction: Adrián Posse
 Photography: Mariana Yazbek, Tomas Casademust, Fernando Velazco
 Photography: Marcela Guadiana

Awards and nominations 

Latin Grammy

Video
 Sería Feliz official video (2000)
 Hoy No Quiero official video (2001)

References 

2000 albums
Sony Music Mexico albums
Julieta Venegas albums
Albums produced by Gustavo Santaolalla